The Productive Muslim Company is a productivity training company.

This virtual organization and a website specializes in providing materials for the Muslim Ummah combining teachings of Islam with contemporary productivity tips and advice. ProductiveMuslim is managed by an international team of volunteers from different countries. These include Saudi Arabia, Malaysia, Egypt and Morocco.

History
ProductiveMuslim.com started as a personal online journal for Mohammed Faris, the founder, where he recorded his thoughts on topics that connect Islam to productivity. In July 2008, the website was launched. With the support of an international team of volunteers, the website grew and its content improved over time. In July 2011, ProductiveMuslim was registered as a company under the name ProductiveMuslim Ltd.

Website

Content
The website has been providing articles, podcasts, retreats, animation videos, doodles and an online academy since October 2008. Today, there are hundreds of articles on the website. The articles represent lessons extracted from the Quran, seerah of the Prophet Muhammad, and history of Islamic civilization, collated with modern tips and tools that lead to a productive lifestyle. The articles are categorised into 6 categories: Ramadan & Productivity, Islam & Productivity, Get Motivated, Feel Better, Work Better and Help Others. They are written by a variety of volunteer contributors, productivity experts and editors. The use of ProductiveMuslim's popular "orange stickman" in the videos added to the distinctive branding of the videos.

Localisation
ProductiveMuslim.com is localised according to languages, not regions. It is available in English, Arabic and French.

Public Interaction

Seminars and Workshops
ProductiveMuslim delivered 2-day seminars in several countries, including Egypt, Malaysia and Saudi Arabia. Topics covered included: definition of productivity, why a Muslim should be productive, the link between spirituality and productivity, managing energy levels, balancing between different roles, building focus and afterlife productivity. Online seminars are delivered where attendees contribute via an online website either through mobile phones, Skype or similar means.

Workshops were organised by Faris for businesses to teach employees different aspects of productivity at work such as time management and personal productivity.

Talks
In 2011, Faris, the founder, appeared in an 8-minute TEDx talk, held in Saudi Arabia, where he talked about how Islam teaches Muslims productivity.

Awards
ProductiveMuslim won the Brass Crescent Awards several times. Brass Crescent Awards is an annual contest where visitors vote for the best Islam-themed online blog in various categories.
 In 2013, ProductiveMuslim won the Best Blog category, and maintained an Honorable Mention in the Best Group Blog category.
 In 2012, ProductiveMuslim won the Best Group Blog category.
 In 2011, ProductiveMuslim won the Best Blog category and the Best Group Blog category.

References

British educational websites
Volunteer organizations
Islam and science
Islamic education